Hans Scheele (18 December 1908 in Kirchwerder – 23 July 1941) was a German athlete who competed in the 1936 Summer Olympics. He was killed in action during World War II.

References

1908 births
1941 deaths
German male sprinters
Olympic athletes of Germany
Athletes (track and field) at the 1936 Summer Olympics
European Athletics Championships medalists
Athletes from Hamburg
German Army personnel killed in World War II
20th-century German people
Military personnel from Hamburg
German Army soldiers of World War II